Simon Blackburn  (born 12 July 1944) is an English academic philosopher known for his work in metaethics, where he defends quasi-realism, and in the philosophy of language; more recently, he has gained a large general audience from his efforts to popularise philosophy.  He has appeared in multiple episodes of the documentary series Closer to Truth.  During his long career, he has taught at Oxford University, Cambridge University, and University of North Carolina, Chapel Hill.

Life and career
Blackburn was born on 12 July 1944 in Chipping Sodbury, England. He attended Clifton College and went on to receive his bachelor's degree in philosophy in 1965 from Trinity College, Cambridge. He obtained his doctorate in 1969 from Churchill College, Cambridge.

He retired as the professor of philosophy at the University of Cambridge in 2011, but remains a distinguished research professor of philosophy at the University of North Carolina at Chapel Hill, teaching every fall semester. He is also a Fellow of Trinity College, Cambridge, and a member of the professoriate of New College of the Humanities. He was previously a Fellow of Pembroke College, Oxford and has also taught full-time at the University of North Carolina as an Edna J. Koury Professor. He is a former president of the Aristotelian Society, having served the 2009–2010 term.  He was elected a Fellow of the British Academy in 2002 and a Foreign Honorary Fellow of the American Academy of Arts & Sciences in 2008.

He is a former editor of the journal Mind.

Philosophical work
In philosophy, he is best known as the proponent of quasi-realism in meta-ethics and as a defender of neo-Humean views on a variety of topics. "The quasi-realist is someone who endorses an anti-realist metaphysical stance but who seeks, through philosophical maneuvering, to earn the right for moral discourse to enjoy all the trappings of realist talk."

In 2008 The Oxford Dictionary of Philosophy, which was authored by Blackburn, was published.

In 2014 Blackburn published Mirror, Mirror: The Uses and Abuses of Self-Love, focusing on different philosophical aspects of self-love, discussing modern forms and manifestations of pride, amour-propre, integrity or self-esteem through various philosophical frameworks and ideas.

Public philosophy

He makes occasional appearances in the British media, such as on BBC Radio 4's The Moral Maze.

He is a patron of Humanists UK (formerly the British Humanist Association), and when asked to define his atheism, he said he prefers the label infidel over atheist:

He was one of 55 public figures to sign an open letter published in The Guardian in September 2010, stating their opposition to Pope Benedict XVI's state visit to the UK, and has argued that "religionists" should have less influence in political affairs.

He was one of 240 academics to sign a letter to the Equality and Human Rights Commission opposing 'radical gender orthodoxy', published in The Sunday Times.

In a televised debate, Blackburn argued against the position of the author and podcaster Sam Harris that morality can be derived straightforwardly from science.

Books 
Reason and Prediction (1973). .
Spreading the Word (1984) – a text. .
The Oxford Dictionary of Philosophy ([1994] 2015), 3rd ed. – compiled whole-handedly. .
Ruling Passions (1998) A defence of a NeoHumean theory of reasons and moral motivation. .
Truth (1999) (edited with Keith Simmons) – from Oxford Readings in Philosophy series. .
Think: A Compelling Introduction to Philosophy.
Being Good (2001) – an introduction to ethics. .
 Reprinted as Ethics: A Very Short Introduction in Oxford University Press' Very Short Introductions series. .
Lust (2004) – one of an Oxford University Press series covering the Seven Deadly Sins. .
Truth: A Guide (2005). .
Plato's Republic: A Biography (2006) – from Atlantic Books' Books That Shook the World series. .
How to read Hume (2008) – Granta Publications. .
"What do we really know? -The Big Questions of Philosophy" – (2009) from Quercus. .
 
Mirror, Mirror: The Uses and Abuses of Self-Love (Princeton, NJ: Princeton University Press, 2014)
On Truth (2018)

References

External links 

 Personal website
 Simon Blackburn talks with Jenny Attiyeh on Thoughtcast
 BBC News story
 Blackburn Essay 'In defence of lust' in The New Statesman
 Blackburn discusses Plato's Republic
 An interview with Simon Blackburn on The Marketplace of Ideas
 Interviewed by Alan Macfarlane 21 April 2009 (video)
 

1944 births
20th-century British philosophers
21st-century British philosophers
Alumni of Trinity College, Cambridge
Analytic philosophers
Cambridge University Moral Sciences Club
English humanists
English philosophers
Fellows of Pembroke College, Oxford
Fellows of the American Academy of Arts and Sciences
Fellows of the British Academy
Fellows of Churchill College, Cambridge
Alumni of Churchill College, Cambridge
Fellows of Trinity College, Cambridge
Living people
People educated at Clifton College
Bertrand Russell Professors of Philosophy
Presidents of the Aristotelian Society
University of North Carolina at Chapel Hill faculty
Mind (journal) editors